Joshua Kyeremeh (died 18 January 2021) was a Ghanaian politician and administrator and security expert. He was a member of the New Patriotic Party and was National security coordinator for the President of Ghana.

Education and career
A product of the KNUST, and a former Director of the National Intelligence Bureau (NIB), formerly known as the Bureau of National Investigations (BNI). He worked there for 22 years and has been at command levels in the Northern, Greater Accra, Ashanti and Upper East. He was also the head of the Investigations Unit of the BNI and rose to the deputy director and later the Director of BNI from 2005 to 2009. After the December elections, he was part of the transition team.

Political life
In January, 2017 he was appointed the National security coordinator at the Flagstaff House by President Nana Akuffo-Addo.

Death 
He died on Monday, 18 January 2021 at the Ga East Municipal Hospital. He died from COVID-19.

References

New Patriotic Party politicians
2021 deaths
Year of birth missing
Kwame Nkrumah University of Science and Technology alumni
Deaths from the COVID-19 pandemic in Ghana